Lyapunov (in old-Russian often written Лепунов) is a Russian surname that is sometimes also romanized as Ljapunov, Liapunov or Ljapunow. Notable people with the surname include:

 Alexey Lyapunov (1911–1973), Russian mathematician
 Aleksandr Lyapunov (1857–1918), son of Mikhail (1820–1868), Russian mathematician and mechanician, after whom the following are named:
 Lyapunov dimension
 Lyapunov equation
 Lyapunov exponent
 Lyapunov function
 Lyapunov fractal
 Lyapunov stability
 Lyapunov's central limit theorem
 Lyapunov time
 Lyapunov vector
 Lyapunov (crater)
 Boris Lyapunov (1862–1943), son of Mikhail (1820–1868), Russian expert in Slavic studies
 Mikhail Lyapunov (1820–1868), Russian astronomer
 Mikhail Nikolaevich Lyapunov (1848–1909), Russian military officer and lawyer
 Prokopy Lyapunov (d. 1611), Russian statesman
 Sergei Lyapunov (1859–1924), son of Mikhail (1820–1868), Russian composer
 Zakhary Lyapunov (d. after 1612), Russian statesman, Prokopy Lyapunov's brother

See also
Lyapunov family, a Russian noble family, to which not all the above individuals necessarily belong

Russian-language surnames